The India Security Press is a government press is a subsidiary of the Security Printing & Minting Corporation of India Limited (SPMCIL), a public undertaking of the Indian government. The company is charged with the task of printing passports, visas, postage stamps, post cards, inland letters, envelopes, non-postal adhesives, court fees, fiscal, and Hundi stamps in the country. 

The press is located near Nashik city in Maharashtra state of India.

References

Nashik
Printing companies of India
Indian companies established in 1925
Executive branch of the government of India
Companies based in Nashik
Printing in India
Government agencies established in 1925
Publishing companies established in 1925